School supply stores sell teaching resources for parents, teachers and homeschoolers.  These stores frequently carry a wide selection of educational materials and decorations for classroom teachers such as books pencils pens and many other supplies.  A teacher store or learning store is often a member of the National School Supply and Equipment Association.

References

Campus services